The 1951 Big Ten Conference football season was the 56th season of college football played by the member schools of the Big Ten Conference (also known as the Western Conference and the Big Nine Conference) and was a part of the 1951 college football season.

The 1951 Illinois Fighting Illini football team, under head coach Ray Eliot, compiled a 9–0–1 record, won the Big Ten championship, was ranked No. 4 in the final AP poll, and defeated Stanford 40–7 in the 1952 Rose Bowl. The lone setback was a scoreless tie with Ohio State. Halfback Johnny Karras was the Big Ten's only consensus first-team All-American. Linebacker Chuck Boerio was selected as the team's most valuable player.

The 1951 Wisconsin Badgers football team, under head coach Ivy Williamson, compiled a 7–1–1 record, led the conference in scoring defense (5.9 points allowed per game), and was ranked No. 8 in the final AP poll. Quarterback John Coatta was the first-team All-Big Ten quarterback. Defensive end Pat O'Donahue was selected as a first-team All-American by multiple selectors.

Season overview

Results and team statistics

Key
AP final = Team's rank in the final AP Poll of the 1951 season
AP high = Team's highest rank in the AP Poll throughout the 1951 season
PPG = Average of points scored per game; conference leader's average displayed in bold
PAG = Average of points allowed per game; conference leader's average displayed in bold
MVP = Most valuable player as voted by players on each team as part of the voting process to determine the winner of the Chicago Tribune Silver Football trophy; trophy winner in bold

Preseason

Regular season

September 29
 Illinois 27, UCLA 13.
 Texas 14, Purdue 0.
 Wisconsin 22, Marquette 6.
 Michigan State 25, Michigan 0.
 Ohio State 7, SMU 0.
 Northwestern 35, Colorado 14.
 Washington 25, Minnesota 20.
 Notre Dame 48, Indiana 6.
 Iowa 16, Kansas State 0.

October 6
 Illinois 14, Wisconsin 10.
 Purdue 34, Iowa 30.
 Stanford 23, Michigan 13.
 Michigan State 24, Ohio State 20.
 Northwestern 20, Army 14.
 California 55, Minnesota 14.
 Indiana 13, Pittsburgh 6.

October 13
 Illinois 41, Syracuse 20.
 Miami (FL) 7, Purdue 0 (game played Friday, October 12).
 Ohio State 6, Wisconsin 6.
 Michigan 33, Indiana 14.
 Ohio State 6, Wisconsin 6.
 Northwestern 21, Minnesota 7.
 Iowa 34, Pittsburgh 17.

October 20
 Illinois 27, Washington 20.
 Wisconsin 31, Purdue 7.
 Michigan 21, Iowa 0.
 Indiana 32, Ohio State 10.
 Northwestern 16, Navy 7.
 Nebraska 39, Minnesota 20.

October 27
 Illinois 21, Indiana 0.
 Notre Dame 30, Purdue 9.
 Wisconsin 41, Northwestern 0.
 Michigan 54, Minnesota 27.
 Ohio State 47, Iowa 21.

November 3
 Illinois 7, Michigan 0.
 Purdue 28, Penn State 0.
 Wisconsin 6, Indiana 0.
 Ohio State 3, Northwestern 0.
 Iowa 20, Minnesota 20.

November 10
 Illinois 40, Iowa 13.
 Purdue 35, Northwestern 14.
 Wisconsin 16, Pennsylvania 7.
 Cornell 20, Michigan 7.
 Ohio State 16, Pittsburgh 14.
 Minnesota 16, Indiana 14.

November 17
 Illinois 0, Ohio State 0.
 Purdue 19, Minnesota 13.
 Wisconsin 34, Iowa 7.
 Northwestern 6, Michigan 0.
 Michigan State 30, Indiana 26

November 24
 Illinois 3, Northwestern 0.
 Purdue 21, Indiana 13.
 Wisconsin 30, Minnesota 6.
 Michigan 7, Ohio State 0.
 Iowa 20, Notre Dame 20.

Bowl games

Post-season developments

Awards and honors

All-Big Ten honors

The following players were picked by the Associated Press (AP)as first-team players on the 1951 All-Big Ten Conference football team.  The AP picked separate offensive and defensive units, whereas the UP selected a single, eleven man unit.

AP offense and UP overall selections

AP defensive unit

All-American honors

At the end of the 1951 season, only one Big Ten player secured a consensus first-team pick on the 1951 College Football All-America Team. The Big Ten's consensus All-Americans were:

Other Big Ten players who were named first-team All-Americans by at least one selector were:

Other awards

Illinois running back Johnny Karras finished sixth in the voting for the 1951 Heisman Trophy.

1952 NFL Draft
The following Big Ten players were among the first 100 picks in the 1952 NFL Draft:

References